The Lebanon men's national volleyball team is the national men's volleyball team of Lebanon. The team's  represent the country in the regional and international competitions.

World Championship
 1949 – Did not enter
 1952 – 9th place
 1956 to   2022  – Did not enter or Did not qualify

Asian Championship

See also
Sport in Lebanon

References

External links
FIVB Competitions 
Lebanon Volleyball Team Sports123 

National men's volleyball teams
Volleyball
Volleyball in Lebanon
Men's sport in Lebanon